Kim Deok-ryeong (Korean: 김덕령; Hanja: 金德龄; 1567-1596) was a renowned Korean general who was known for his heroic and valiant acts during the Japanese invasions in mid-Joseon (the year of Imjin, 1592). His alias was Chungjang. “His life and acts are recorded in Yeollyeosilgisul (Narratives of Yeollyeosil) and story collections like Dongpaenaksong (Tales of the Eastern Kingdom for Repeated Recitation) and Daedonggimum (Strange Tales of the Great East).” It is believed that his story is an epic which tells about a national hero who was frustrated.

Background 
Kim Deok-ryeong was born of lowly status in Gwangju near Mount Mudeung in 1567 (the first year of King Seonjo’s reign). His ancestors were from Gwangsan. His father was Kim Bung-seob. Kim was taught by Seong Hon from the age of 20 along with Kim Deok-hong. According to legends, Kim’s father prepared the tombs for his ancestors on an auspicious location identified by an eminent Chinese geomancer that would produce a hero, after which Kim Deok-ryeong was born. From his childhood, Kim was agile and brave. Although he was of small built, Kim was strong enough to catch a tiger with his bare hands and chased them to rescue his friends. He also carried a 60 Kg iron hammer on his waist. He commanded as a champion in wrestling competitions across the country, winning all the oxen offered as the prize. Troubled with his boasting, Kim’s older sister entered a wrestling contest with him disguising as a man and eventually defeated him. Later, when Kim learned that he had lost to his sister, he came up with a life and death contest proposal against her. He was given the task of climbing Mt. Mudeung within a day while his sister had to make a coat by weaving hemp. Upon his arrival from the mountain, Kim noticed that his sister had purposely left the coat undone. He then killed his sister after claiming himself as the winner.

Military career 
In 1592, when Japan invaded Korea to subdue the Japanese, Kim raised an army in the cause of justice along with his brother. He reached Jeonju and fends off the Japanese army, who were trying to infiltrate Jeolla province. However, on his brother’s persuasion, Kim returned home to support their mother. In 1593, after his mother’s demise, Kim was persuaded to raise an army by Damyang, Vice-envoy Yi Gyeong-rin, and Jangseong County Governor Yi Gwi.

Kim Deok-ryeong was honored with the military title of ‘Chungyongjang’ by King Seonjo with the post of Hyeongjo Joarang as he widened his sphere of influence. In 1594, Kim was donned with the title of ‘Wing Dragon General’ by the prince for his gallantry and ingenuity. He was also bestowed with the military title of ‘Joseon General’ from King Seonjo.

The period when Kim stayed in Namweon and moved to Jinju, the court integrated all the armies which were raised in the cause of justice across the country into the Chungyong Army to regulate coordinated and organized operations & provisions. Kim Deok-ryeong, as the commander of the Chungyong Army, under the leadership of Kwon Yul defended the southwestern part of Korea along with Gwak Jae-wu. Kim opposed the Japanese army between Jinhae and Goseong to impede their infiltration into the Jeolla province but no remarkable battles were fought as overtures of peace were afoot and also their provisions were insufficient. Out of 3000 soldiers under his command, Kim made 2500 soldiers return to their farms. Kim spurred a campaign and defeated the Japanese army stationed at Geoje Island. In 1595, he also rebutted the Japanese army trying to permeate Goseong.

Although Kim made several preparations for the battle, he got no chance to go to the front because of the peace negotiations. He got himself drunk in a surge of anger and imposed military law too strictly which resulted in innumerable complaints from soldiers and staff officers against him. Kim was then imprisoned in 1596 on the suspicion of flogging Yun Geon Su’s servant to death but was soon released on to the appeals of Confucians scholars in the Yeongnam Region and the defense of Jeong Tak. 

In July 1596, Yi Mong-hak waged an armed insurgency in Hongsan. Kim was arrested along with Choi Dam-nyeon, Kwak Jae-wu, Ko Eon-baek, and Hong Gye-nam on a false accusation of his involvement in the Yi Mong-hak revolt by Han Hyeon and Shin Gyeong-haeng. Later Kim was executed due to the court’s wrongful indictment.

In 1661 (2nd year of Hyeonjong’s reign), Kim was reinstated and promoted to the Minister of Defense posthumously.

Death 
According to the legends, when the Japanese invaded, Kim refused to go to the front. He was then in mourning for his sister and during that period it was a taboo to kill living beings. It is believed that he used his supernatural powers to threaten and drove off the enemies. For this, he was charged with failing to kill his enemies and was produced to the court as a traitor. The court attempted to execute Kim but failed as he was considered to be invulnerable. Later, Kim demanded a plaque from the king that read, “Kim Deok-ryeong, Loyal Subject of All Ages”, only to reveal his weakness. When his proposal was accepted, he told his executors that he would die if they removed the scales behind his knees and struck him three times. He died in prison after enduring six bouts of severe torture over twenty days.

There are various versions of Kim Deok Ryeong's legend.

“Within the oral tradition, Kim Deok-ryeong is acknowledged as the top martial hero during the Japanese invasions, and it is believed that Kim was so courageous that if he had been able to engage in battle, he would have easily ended the war.”

“Kim’s execution due to false accusations is historically accurate and the legend, as an archetype of the tragic historical hero tale, reflects a critical view that the kingdom’s ruling class killed a reputed general for political gain.”

References 

1567 births
1596 deaths